Richard Granville Swinburne (IPA )  (born December 26, 1934) is an English philosopher. He is an Emeritus Professor of Philosophy at the University of Oxford. Over the last 50 years Swinburne has been a proponent of philosophical arguments for the existence of God. His philosophical contributions are primarily in the philosophy of religion and philosophy of science. He aroused much discussion with his early work in the philosophy of religion, a trilogy of books consisting of The Coherence of Theism, The Existence of God, and Faith and Reason.

Early life 
Swinburne was born in Smethwick, Staffordshire, England, on 26 December 1934. His father was a school music teacher, who was himself the son of an off-licence owner in Shoreditch. His mother was a secretary, the daughter of an optician. He is an only child. Swinburne attended a preparatory school and then Charterhouse School.

Academic career
Swinburne received an open scholarship to study classics at Exeter College, Oxford, but in fact graduated with a first-class Bachelor of Arts degree in philosophy, politics, and economics. 
Swinburne has held various professorships through his career in academia. From 1972 to 1985 he taught at Keele University. During part of this time, he gave the Gifford lectures at Aberdeen from 1982 to 1984, resulting in the book The Evolution of the Soul. From 1985 until his retirement in 2002 he was Nolloth Professor of the Philosophy of the Christian Religion at the University of Oxford (his successor to this chair was Brian Leftow). He has continued to publish regularly since his retirement.

Swinburne has been an active author throughout his career, producing a major book every two to three years. He has played a role in recent debate over the mind–body problem, defending a substance dualism that recalls the work of René Descartes in important respects (see The Evolution of the Soul, 1997).

His books are primarily very technical works of academic philosophy, but he has written at the popular level as well. Of the non-technical works, his Is There a God? (1996), summarising for a non-specialist audience many of his arguments for the existence of God and plausibility in the belief of that existence, is probably the most popular, and is available in 22 languages.

Christian apologetics

A member of the Orthodox Church, he is noted as one of the foremost Christian apologists, arguing in his many articles and books that faith in Christianity is rational and coherent in a rigorous philosophical sense. William Hasker writes that his "tetralogy on Christian doctrine, together with his earlier trilogy on the philosophy of theism, is one of the most important apologetic projects of recent times." While Swinburne presents many arguments to advance the belief that God exists, he argues that God is a being whose existence is not logically necessary (see modal logic), but metaphysically necessary in a way he defines in his The Christian God. Other subjects on which Swinburne writes include personal identity (in which he espouses a view based on the concept of a soul), and epistemic justification. He has written in defence of Cartesian dualism and libertarian free will.

Although he is best known for his vigorous defence of Christian intellectual commitments, he also has a theory of the nature of passionate faith which is developed in his book Faith and Reason.

According to an interview Swinburne did with Foma magazine, he converted from Anglicanism (Church of England) to Eastern Orthodoxy around 1996:
I don't think I changed my beliefs in any significant way. I always believed in the Apostolic succession: that the Church has to have its authority dating back to the Apostles, and the general teaching of the Orthodox Church on the saints and the prayers for the departed and so on, these things I have always believed.

Swinburne's philosophical method reflects the influence of Thomas Aquinas. He admits that he draws from Aquinas a systematic approach to philosophical theology. Swinburne, like Aquinas, moves from basic philosophical issues (for example, the question of the possibility that God may exist in Swinburne's The Coherence of Theism), to more specific Christian beliefs (for example, the claim in Swinburne's Revelation that God has communicated to human beings propositionally in Jesus Christ).

Swinburne moves in his writing program from the philosophical to the theological, building his case and relying on his previous arguments as he defends particular Christian beliefs. He has attempted to reassert classical Christian beliefs with an apologetic method that he believes is compatible with contemporary science. That method relies heavily on inductive logic, seeking to show that his Christian beliefs fit best with the evidence.

National Life Stories conducted an oral history interview (C1672/15) with Richard Swinburne in 2015–2016 for its Science and Religion collection held by the British Library.

Major books 
 Space and Time, 1968
 The Concept of Miracle, 1970, 
 The Coherence of Theism, 1977 (new edition 2016) (part 1 of his trilogy on Theism)
 The Existence of God, 1979 (new edition 2004) (part 2 of his trilogy on Theism)
 Faith and Reason, 1981 (new edition 2005). (part 3 of his trilogy on Theism)
 The Evolution of the Soul, 1986, . (1997 edition online)
 Miracles, 1989
 Responsibility and Atonement, 1989 (part 1 of his tetralogy on Christian Doctrines)
 Revelation, 1991 (part 2 of his tetralogy on Christian Doctrines)
 The Christian God, 1994 (part 3 of his tetralogy on Christian Doctrines)
 Is There a God?, 1996, ; revised edition, 2010, 
 Simplicity as Evidence of Truth, The Aquinas Lecture, 1997
 Providence and the Problem of Evil, 1998 (part 4 of his tetralogy on Christian Doctrines)
 Epistemic Justification, 2001
 The Resurrection of God Incarnate, 2003
 Was Jesus God?, 2008
 Free Will and Modern Science, Ed. 2011, 
 Mind, Brain, and Free Will, 2013
 Are We Bodies or Souls?, 2019,

Spiritual autobiography 
 Richard Swinburne, "Natural Theology and Orthodoxy," in Turning East: Contemporary Philosophers and the Ancient Christian Faith, Rico Vitz, ed. (St. Vladimir's Seminary Press, 2012), pp. 47–78.
 Richard Swinburne, "The Vocation of a Natural Theologian," in Philosophers Who Believe, Kelly James Clark, ed. (Downers Grove: InterVarsity Press, 1993), pp. 179–202.

See also 
 James Joyce Award
 List of scholars on the relationship between religion and science
 Theodicy

References

Footnotes

Works cited

Further reading

External links

 – Includes a curriculum vitae and more complete list of publications
Presentation at Gifford lectures
Richard Swinburne, Faith and Reason review from Diapsalmata
The Moscow Center for Consciousness Studies video interview with Richard Swinburne 31 May 2010.

1934 births
Living people
20th-century English philosophers
20th-century English theologians
21st-century English philosophers
21st-century English theologians
Academics of Keele University
Academics of the University of Hull
Alumni of Exeter College, Oxford
Analytic philosophers
Analytic theologians
Christian apologists
Converts to Eastern Orthodoxy from Anglicanism
Critics of atheism
Eastern Orthodox philosophers
English Eastern Orthodox Christians
Fellows of Oriel College, Oxford
Fellows of the British Academy
Nolloth Professors of the Philosophy of the Christian Religion
Philosophers of religion
Philosophers of science
Philosophical cosmologists
Writers about religion and science
People educated at Charterhouse School